Benedict XIII may refer to:

Pope Benedict XIII (1649–1730), pope from 1724 to 1730
Antipope Benedict XIII (1328–1423), based in Avignon, France, in opposition to the pope in Rome

See also
Pope Benedict (disambiguation)